Drumstick is the brand name, owned by Froneri, a joint venture between Nestlé and PAI Partners, for a variety of frozen dessert-filled ice cream cones sold in the United States, Australia, Canada, Malaysia, Hong Kong, and other countries around the world. The original product was invented by I.C. Parker of the Drumstick Company of Fort Worth, Texas, in 1928.

Overview
A typical drumstick consists of a sugar cone filled with vanilla frozen dairy dessert topped with a hardened chocolate shell and nuts, and much later, with a chocolate-lined cone and a chunk of chocolate at the bottom invented at the West End factory in Brisbane. Drumsticks are available from a variety of supermarkets, ice cream trucks, and convenience stores.

Due to the historic popularity of this dessert, it is commonly called a "drumstick" even if it is manufactured by some other company and branded otherwise. "Forever Summer" has been a tagline for this brand.

History
In 1928, the Parker BrothersBruce, I.C., and J.T.added to the invention of the waffle cone by adding a chocolate coating with nuts to it. One of the brothers' wives said that this invention looked like a chicken leg, commonly nicknamed a drumstick in the US.

Nestlé purchased the Drumstick Company in 1991. In 2016, Nestlé and PAI Partners established Froneri, a joint venture to combine the two companies' ice cream activities.

In 2019, a cereal from General Mills based on Drumsticks was released with two flavors, vanilla and mint chocolate.

Flavors
Additional varieties of Drumstick include caramel and fudge-filled cones, Mint Chocolate Crunch, Cookies and Cream Crunch, and simply dipped, cones filled with caramel, chocolate, and plain vanilla are also found. In Canada, Nestlé offers a chocolate dipped Oreo Drumstick as well as Strawberry Cheesecake Drumstick.

According to the official website, the following Drumstick flavors are produced:

 Classic
 Simply Dipped
 Pretzel Dipped
 Crunch Dipped
 Cookie Dipped
 Mini Drums
 Lil’ Drums
 Sprinkled!
 Super Nugget
 King Size

Non-dairy additions
In early 2020, Nestlé released two vegan varieties of the dessert in Canada.
Caramel
Vanilla Chocolate Swirl
On April 16, 2021, Nestlé Canada recalled both flavours over concerns that the products may contain dairy not included on the ingredients label.

See also
 Cornetto (ice cream), competitor from Unilever

References

External links

 Official website
 Parker Gift Supports New Food Science and Technology Facility, Ohio State University

Ice cream brands
Froneri